Roland C. Wagner (6 September 1960 – 5 August 2012) was a French writer of humorous science fiction. Since his professional debut in 1981, he had written around one hundred novellas and around fifty novels. He was the only writer to have received the Prix Rosny-Aîné seven times, as well as many other awards.

Biography 
Roland Wagner was born in Bab El Oued, Algeria during the Algerian War of Independence. After the war, his family left Algeria like many Pieds-Noirs and settled in Clamart. Throughout his youth, Wagner was an avid reader of Fleuve Noir Anticipation and other science-fiction stories. He began writing his own stories at age 15. In 1981, he won the Prix Rosny-Aîné for his short story Faire-part. He was killed in an automobile accident on 5 August 2012.

Major works

Histoire d'un futur
Les Futurs Mystères de Paris ("The Future Mysteries of Paris") features a "transparent" (not exactly invisible) private detective. Starting with La Balle du néant ("The Bullet From Nowhere"), this cycle has nine titles (up to Mine de rien, 2006) inside a larger set, including Le Chant du cosmos ("The Song of the Cosmos"), a far-future tale which describes a mental game inspired by Go.

Rêves de Gloire
Rêves de Gloire (Dreams of Glory) is an alternate history of Algeria with several divergence points. One of them is the assassination of Charles de Gaulle before the Évian Accords.

Other works
Roland C. Wagner had written under multiple pseudonyms, including Richard Wolfram and Red Deff.

La Saison de la sorcière ("Season of the Witch", 2003) takes place in France with extremely high-level police security, which is invaded by the United States.  The novel received the Bob Morane Prize and the Prix Rosny-Aîné in 2004. Le Temps du voyage ("Trip Time", 2005) is a space opera in the mood of Jack Vance.

He had also written an alternate history biography of H. P. Lovecraft under the title HPL (1890–1991) which has been translated in English, and several pastiches of famous science fiction authors. For example, his  Three Laws of Robotic Sexuality  parodies Isaac Asimov's robot stories.

Other activities

Music
He also wrote lyrics for rock bands, and is a member of the acid punk group Brain Damage, active since 1977.

Awards and honors 
Asteroid 428102 Rolandwagner, discovered by astronomer Bernard Christophe at Saint-Sulpice Observatory  in 2006, was named in his memory.
 The official  was published by the Minor Planet Center on 2 February 2017.

Selected bibliography (novels) 

 Le Serpent d'angoisse (1987)
 Poupée aux yeux morts (1988) (alternate title: L'Œil du fouinain)
 Le paysage déchiré (1989)
 Les derniers jours de mai (1989)
 Les Psychopompes de Klash (1990)
 La Sinsé gravite au 21 (1991)
 Cette crédille qui nous ronge (1991)
 La Balle du néant (1996)
 Les Ravisseurs quantiques (1996)
 L'Odyssée de l'espèce (1997)
 L'Aube incertaine (1997)
 Tekrock (1999)
 Le Chant du Cosmos (1999)
 Tøøns (2000)
 Musique de l'énergie (2000 – short story collection)
 Babaluma (2002)
 Kali Yuga (2003)
 La Saison de la sorcière (2003)
 Le Temps du voyage (2005)
 Pax Americana (2005)
 L.G.M. (2006)
 Mine de rien (2006)
 Rêves de Gloire (2011)

See also 
 French science fiction

References

External links
 
 List of publications at L'Atalante (in English) 
 Official site (in French)
 Du pays de la peur (his musical & political blog, in French)

1960 births
2012 deaths
People from Bab El Oued
Pieds-Noirs
French science fiction writers
German–French translators
French male novelists
20th-century French novelists
20th-century French translators
French speculative fiction translators
20th-century French male writers
French male non-fiction writers